SunPower Corporation is an American provider of photovoltaic solar energy generation systems and battery energy storage products, primarily for residential customers. The company, headquartered in San Jose, California, was founded in 1985 by Richard Swanson, an electrical engineering professor from Stanford University. Cypress Semiconductor bought a majority interest in the company in 2002, growing it quickly until SunPower went public in 2005. TotalEnergies, a French energy and oil company purchased a controlling interest in SunPower for  billion in 2011.

The company previously developed and manufactured photovoltaic panels, before spinning off that part of its business off in 2020 as Maxeon Solar Technologies. The company was also previously marketed its products to commercial and industrial customers before agreeing to sell that business line to TotalEnergies in February 2022.

History

Early history 
SunPower was founded on April 24, 1985, by Richard Swanson, who was a Stanford University professor focused on electrical engineering. Swanson studied solar power efficiency in the Stanford Electronics Laboratory with funding from research grants. After breaking a record for solar power efficiency in lab conditions, he took a sabbatical to start SunPower and commercialize the technology. Initially, the company was called Eos and was funded with $2,000 in savings between Swanson and his friend Richard Crane. In 1989, Robert Lorenzini invested in the company, became its chairman, and changed the name to SunPower.

Some of SunPower's early revenues were from research grants and using its manufacturing facilities to create silicon wafers for semiconductor companies. Interest grew as SunPower completed prototype installations and portable electronics that use solar power became more popular. Swanson resigned from his academic position at Stanford in 1991, in order to focus on SunPower full-time. The company's revenues grew from $600,000 in 1989 to $1.4 million in 1995, and $6 million in 1996. However, by 2001 the company was anticipating having to lay off half of its employees.

Growth 
SunPower founder Richard Swanson's former classmate, T.J. Rodgers, was the CEO of Cypress Semiconductor and took an interest in investing in the company. At first, the Cypress board wasn't willing to invest, so Rodgers invested $750,000 of his own money. Starting with an investment of $8 million, Cypress eventually invested about $150 million, acquiring a controlling interest in SunPower in 2002. Cypress appointed Tom Werner as the new CEO the following year.

Demand for SunPower's products increased in the early 2000s, due to rising utility costs, government subsidies, and its new A-300 solar cell. In particular, SunPower grew in Germany and California, where new government subsidies were being introduced. By 2005, SunPower was not yet profitable, but had $200 million in backlogged orders. Revenues increased from $5 million in 2003 to $78.7 million in 2005.

As the company was getting closer to profitability, it filed an initial public offering. The 2005 offering raised $138.6 million in funding. The following year, SunPower was profitable for the first time with $236.5 million in revenues. SunPower moved into a larger corporate headquarters location in San Jose, California and secured several contracts with major retailers for solar panel installations. In 2007, SunPower announced plans to expand its manufacturing facility five-fold and build a second factory.

SunPower collaborated with PowerLight to develop its roofing-tile solar product called SunTile. In order to combine their R&D efforts, SunPower acquired PowerLight for $265 million, in January 2007. Analysts estimated the acquisition doubled SunPower's size. Shortly afterwards, PowerLight secured a $330 million contract, the largest SunPower had ever done. By 2007, half of Cypress' revenues, or $775 million, was coming from its investment in SunPower. SunPower was spun-off as a separate business from Cypress in 2008.

Recent history 
SunPower acquired Sunray Renewable Energy, a solar panel company based in Italy, for $277 million in 2010, in order to expand in Europe. The following year, SunPower cut back production due to an overall market decline in solar power purchases. SunPower also announced the French oil and gas company Total was acquiring a majority interest in SunPower for $1.37 billion. In 2012, SunPower founder Richard Swanson retired, though he continued to serve on the SunPower advisory board.

By 2013, SunPower's revenues rebounded and it started expanding its manufacturing facilities again. That same year, it acquired Greenbotics, which developed automated cleaning systems for solar panels, and Dragonfly, which developed solar micro-inverters. This was followed by SunPower's 2014 acquisition of SolarBridge, which developed microinverters used to improve the efficiency of solar panels.

In 2014, SunPower raised $220 million from Bank of America and Merrill Lynch, in order to fund customer financing options. That same year, SunPower invested $20 million in a home energy app company called Tendril. As part of the deal, the two companies began integrating their products, so the home automation software from Tendril could time heavy energy use for when the solar panels are generating the most power.

In 2019, SunPower announced it was going to spin-off its manufacturing division into a separate business in Singapore named Maxeon Solar Technologies. As part of the deal, Tianjin Zhonghuan Semiconductor Co invested $298 million for a 29% interest in Maxeon. The remaining SunPower business became focused on services, installation, batteries, and other products. In 2021, former CEO Tom Werner retired and Peter Faricy took his place as CEO of SunPower.

In February 2022, SunPower investor TotalEnergies purchased SunPower's commercial and industrial divisions for $250 million, as part of SunPower's transition to focusing on residential installations. In May 2022, SunPower announced a partnership with IKEA to sell to customers in their California stores.

Products and services 
SunPower designs and markets solar power-related products and services. For example, it sells, installs, and finances panels, batteries, mounts, and software. Its products are known for being more expensive, but producing energy more efficiently than competing products. SunPower is often used when there is a limited amount of space for the panels, such as on rooftops.

Ordinarily, the electrical contacts are on the front of a solar panel, facing the sun. The front of SunPower's panels channel the light to electrical contacts on the back of the panel, reducing the amount of sunlight that is reflected, rather than turned into energy. The company first started leasing solar panels in 2011 and started a pilot project for battery products around 2014.

Most of SunPower's sales are in the United States. In SunPower's early history it built many of the largest solar power plants in the United States. In 2008, SunPower started building large-scale solar farms for utilities companies PG&E and OptiSolar in San Luis Obispo and Hayward respectively. It also built other large installations, such as at the Kennedy Space Center. SunPower also built the Bavaria Solarpark in Germany in 2004. The plant spans 62 acres over three locations. At the time, it was the largest solar power plant in the world.

Notes

References

External links 
 

Photovoltaics manufacturers
Solar energy companies of the United States
Solar energy in California
Manufacturing companies based in California
Technology companies based in the San Francisco Bay Area
Companies based in San Jose, California
Energy companies established in 1985
Renewable resource companies established in 1985
1985 establishments in California
TotalEnergies
Companies listed on the Nasdaq
Energy in the San Francisco Bay Area
2005 initial public offerings
American companies established in 1985